Pudsey is a neighbourhood in the village of  Cornholme, Calderdale, West Yorkshire, England. It is near the town of Todmorden and  the A646 Burnley Road.

Hamlets in West Yorkshire